Aptandra is a genus of flowering plants. In the APG IV system, the genus is placed in the family Olacaceae. Other sources place it in the segregate family Aptandraceae.

Its native range is Southern Tropical America, Western Tropical Africa to Angola.

Species:

Aptandra caudata 
Aptandra liriosmoides 
Aptandra tubicina 
Aptandra zenkeri

References

Olacaceae
Santalales genera